Cechenena subangustata is a moth of the family Sphingidae.

Distribution 
It is known from Nepal, north-eastern India, Thailand, south-western China, Taiwan, Malaysia (Peninsular, Sarawak) and Indonesia (Sumatra, Java, Kalimantan).

Description 
It is very similar to Cechenena lineosa, but larger and the forewing is completely green. Furthermore, both wings are more yellowish below.

References

Cechenena
Moths described in 1920